Rambawela is a village in Sri Lanka. It is located within the Central Province. It is located 128 km (79 mi) northeast of Colombo,Sri Lanka's capital.

See also
List of towns in Central Province, Sri Lanka

External links

Populated places in Central Province, Sri Lanka